, also known by  and his Chinese style name , was a bureaucrat of Ryukyu Kingdom.

Urasoe was the eldest son of Nukanakagusuku, and was also a grandson of Yuwan Ufunushi. Urasoe was the adoptive father of King Shō Gen. He brought Shō Gen up and had close relationships with each other. After Aragusuku Anki retired, Urasoe was appointed as a member of Sanshikan.

Urasoe was the originator of Ba-uji Oroku Dunchi, which was one of the "Five Aristocratic Families" in Ryukyuan history. He was buried in  after he died. King Shō Gen attended his funeral. His eldest son, Nago Ryōin, succeeded his position.

References

|-

1566 deaths
People of the Ryukyu Kingdom
Ryukyuan people
16th-century Ryukyuan people
Ueekata
Sanshikan